Szemud  (formerly ) is a village in Wejherowo County, Pomeranian Voivodeship, in northern Poland. It is the seat of the gmina (administrative district) called Gmina Szemud.

The village has a population of 1,639.

References

Szemud